Xenophylla is a genus of moths belonging to the subfamily Tortricinae of the family Tortricidae. It contains only one species, Xenophylla megalogona, which is found on Madagascar.

See also
List of Tortricidae genera

References

External links
Tortricid.net

Archipini
Monotypic moth genera
Moths described in 1947
Moths of Madagascar
Tortricidae genera